Britta Huttenlocher (born 1962) is a Swiss painter.

Awards
1999 Winner of the Manor Cultural Prize (German: Manor Kunstpreis).

References

1962 births
Living people
20th-century Swiss painters
21st-century Swiss painters
20th-century Swiss women artists
21st-century Swiss women artists
Swiss contemporary artists
Swiss women painters